Wollny is a surname. It is a spelling variant of Wolny, Volny, or Volný. Notable people with the surname include:
 Ewald Wollny (1846–1901), German physicist
 Michael Wollny (born 1978), German jazz pianist and music educator
 Peter Wollny (born 1961), German musicologist

See also
 Wolny

Slavic-language surnames